Lee Nelson may refer to:

 Lee Nelson (American football) (b. 1954), retired American football player
 Lee Nelson (cricketer) (born 1990), Irish cricketer
 Lee Nelson, a comedy character created by Simon Brodkin
 Lee Nelson's Well Good Show, a 2010 British television comedy show
 Lee Nelson's Well Funny People, a 2013 British television comedy show
 Lee Nelson (poker player) (b. 1943), New Zealand doctor and professional poker player

See also